Lang Film is a film and TV production company based in Freienstein, Switzerland. The company produces documentary films, feature films and TV films. Lang Film is one of the most well-known Swiss film production companies. The company also includes Langfilm Distribution and the cinema neues KINO in Freienstein.

History
The company is responsible for the production of Swiss film classics such as Höhenfeuer by Fredi M. Murer and The Mountain by Markus Imhoof.

Filmography 

A selection

 Höhenfeuer by Fredi M. Murer 1985
 The Mountain by Markus Imhoof 1990
 Benny's Video by Michael Haneke 1992
 The Friend by Micha Lewinsky 2007
 Will you marry us? by Micha Lewinsky 2009
 Electroboy by Marcel Gisler 2014

External links 
 Lang Film webpage

References 

Film production companies of Switzerland
Mass media companies established in 1980
Swiss companies established in 1980